Kjell Arnljot Wig (31 December 1924 – 18 January 2015) was a Norwegian media personality. He was born in Stjørdal and died in Bærum. He was a journalist for Morgenbladet from 1948, and was assigned with the Norwegian Broadcasting Corporation from 1963 to 1992. He hosted a series of television shows, including Aktuell debatt, Vindu mot verden and Åpen post. Among his books are Det skjulte Norge from 1969, Kongen ser tilbake from 1977, and Eventyret om Blaafarveværket from 1995.

References

1924 births
2015 deaths
People from Stjørdal
Personnel of the legal purge in Norway
Norwegian journalists
Norwegian television presenters
NRK people